Acrobasis mirabiella is a species of snout moth in the genus Acrobasis. It was described by Sergiusz Graf von Toll in 1948. It is found in Iran.

References

Moths described in 1948
Acrobasis
Moths of Asia